Marquess of Ely, of the County of Wexford, is a title in the Peerage of Ireland. It was created in 1800 for Charles Loftus, 1st Earl of Ely. He was born Charles Tottenham, the son of Sir John Tottenham, 1st Baronet, who had been created a baronet, of Tottenham Green in the County of Wexford, in the Baronetage of Ireland in 1780, by Elizabeth, daughter of Nicholas Loftus, 1st Viscount Loftus, sister and heiress of Henry Loftus, 1st Earl of Ely (see Viscount Loftus and Earl of Ely for earlier history of the Loftus family). In 1783 he succeeded to the Loftus estates on the death of his maternal uncle the Earl of Ely and assumed the same year by Royal licence the surname of Loftus in lieu of his patronymic. In 1785 he was raised to the Peerage of Ireland as Baron Loftus, of Loftus Hall in the County of Wexford. It was sold by the family in 1917 and is today owned by the Quigley family.

He was further honoured when he was made Viscount Loftus, of Ely, in 1789, Earl of Ely, in the Kingdom of Ireland, in 1794, and Marquess of Ely, of the County of Wexford, in 1800, all in the Peerage of Ireland, becoming one of the few persons to rise to the rank of Marquess without having inherited any peerages. In 1801 he was created Baron Loftus, of Long Loftus in the County of York, in the Peerage of the United Kingdom, by which title the Marquesses of Ely sat in the House of Lords until the passage of the House of Lords Act 1999. Lord Ely also succeeded his father as second Baronet in 1786.

Lord Ely was succeeded by his eldest son, John, the second Marquess. He had previously represented County Wexford in both the Irish and British Parliaments. On his death, the titles passed to his eldest son, John, the third Marquess. He briefly represented Woodstock in Parliament in 1845. This line of the family failed on the early death of his son, John, the fourth Marquess, in 1889. The late Marquess was succeeded by his first cousin John Loftus, the fifth Marquess. He was the eldest son of Reverend Lord Adam Loftus, third son of the second Marquess. The fifth Marquess died childless in 1925 and was succeeded by his youngest brother, George, the sixth Marquess. The latter's only surviving son, George, the seventh Marquess, was High Sheriff of County Fermanagh. On his death in 1969 without surviving children the line of the second Marquess failed. The late Marquess was succeeded by his third cousin once removed, Charles Tottenham, who became the eighth Marquess. He was the great-grandson of Lieutenant-Colonel Charles John Tottenham, DL, JP, eldest son of the Right Reverend Lord Robert Tottenham (who had not assumed the surname Loftus), second son of the first Marquess. The eighth Marquess lived in Canada. As of 2014, the titles are held by his eldest son, the ninth Marquess, who succeeded in 2006. As of 28 February 2014, the present Baronet has not successfully proven his succession and is therefore not on the Official Roll of the Baronetage, with the baronetcy considered dormant since 2006.

Several other members of the family may also be mentioned. Charles Tottenham, father of the first Baronet, represented New Ross in the Irish House of Commons. Charles Tottenham, brother of the first Baronet, also represented New Ross in the Irish Parliament. The aforementioned the Right Reverend Lord Robert Tottenham, second son of the first Marquess, was Bishop of Clogher. Jane Loftus (1820-1890) was the wife of the second Marquess, and Lady of the Bedchamber and great friend of Queen Victoria. Henry Loftus Tottenham (1860–1950), son of John Francis Tottenham, son of Lord Robert Tottenham, was an admiral in the Royal Navy. Sir Alexander Robert Loftus Tottenham (1873–1946), son of John Francis Tottenham, was the administrator of Pudukkottai in British India. The Very Reverend George Tottenham (1825–1911), son of Lord Robert Tottenham, was Dean of Clogher. Lord Augustus Loftus, fourth son of the second Marquess, was a prominent diplomat.  The Right Reverend Ann Tottenham, daughter of the eighth Marquess, was a bishop in the Anglican Church of Canada.

The title refers to Ely in County Wicklow, not to the City of Ely in Cambridgeshire, and the second syllable is pronounced to rhyme with "lee" rather than "lie" (the title is not pronounced in the same way as the first name Eli).

The similar title Marquess of the Isle of Ely was created with the Dukedom of Edinburgh in 1726.

The family seat was Loftus Hall, near Hook, County Wexford.

Tottenham, later Loftus, later Tottenham baronets, of Tottenham Green (1780)
Sir John Tottenham, 1st Baronet (1714–1786)
Sir Charles Loftus, 2nd Baronet (1738–1806) (created Baron Loftus in 1785, Viscount Loftus in 1789, Earl of Ely in 1794 and Marquess of Ely in 1800)

Marquesses of Ely (1800)
Charles Loftus, 1st Marquess of Ely (1738–1806)
John Loftus, 2nd Marquess of Ely (1770–1845)
John Henry Loftus, 3rd Marquess of Ely (1814–1857)
John Henry Wellington Graham Loftus, 4th Marquess of Ely (1849–1889)
John Henry Loftus, 5th Marquess of Ely (1851–1925)
George Herbert Loftus, 6th Marquess of Ely (1854–1935)
George Henry Wellington Loftus, 7th Marquess of Ely (1903–1969)
Charles John Tottenham, 8th Marquess of Ely (1913–2006)
(Charles) John Tottenham, 9th Marquess of Ely (born 1943)

Present peer
Charles John Tottenham, 9th Marquess of Ely (born 12 February 1943) is the son of the 8th Marquess and his wife Katherine Elizabeth Craig. He uses his middle name of John and was educated at Trinity College School, Port Hope, Ontario, Canada, Collège de Genève, International School, Geneva, and the University of Toronto, where he graduated BA and MA. He was styled as Viscount Loftus between 1969 and 2006, when he succeeded to the peerages and baronetcy. In 2003 he lived in Calgary, Alberta, where he was head of the French department at Strathcona-Tweedsmuir School.

In 1969, Ely married Judith Marvelle Porter, daughter of Dr John Jacob Porter, and they have two adopted children:
Andrew John Tottenham (born 1973)
Jennifer Katherine Tottenham (born 1975)

The heir presumptive is the present peer’s brother Lord Timothy Craig Tottenham (born 1948), whose heir apparent is his elder son Scott Craig Tottenham (born 1977), whose son Charles Craig Luis Tottenham (born 2007) is next in line.

 Charles Loftus, 1st Marquess of Ely (1738–1806)
Rt. Rev. Lord Robert Tottenham (1773–1850)
Charles John Tottenham (1808–1870)
Charles Robert Worsley Tottenham (1845–1923)
George Leonard Tottenham (1879–1928)
 Charles Tottenham, 8th Marquess of Ely (1913–2006)
 John Tottenham, 9th Marquess of Ely (b. 1943)
(1). Lord Timothy Craig Tottenham (b. 1948)
(2). Scott Craig Tottenham (b. 1977)
(3). Charles Craig Luis Tottenham (b. 2007)
(4). John Douglas Tottenham (b. 1981)
(5). Nathanial Charles Tottenham (b. 2012)
(6). Lord Richard Ivor Tottenham (b. 1954)
Very Rev. George Tottenham (1825–1911)
Edward Loftus Tottenham (1867–1949)
George William Loftus Tottenham (1911–1998)
Robert Ashley Christopher Tottenham (1953–1990)
male issue in succession

See also
Earl of Ely

References

Sources

External links

Marquessates in the Peerage of Ireland
Loftus family
1726 establishments in Great Britain
Noble titles created in 1800